John Jenkins Cole   (25 March 1815 – 10 May 1897) was an English architect.

Biography
Cole was born on 25 March 1815 in Devonport, Plymouth, the son of Robert Cole, a solicitor, and his wife, Mary. He was educated at Merchant Taylors' School.

Cole was originally trained as a solicitor, but soon moved into architecture, studying under Alfred Ainger. He was made a Fellow of the Royal Institute of British Architects (FRIBA) in 1848.

In 1855, Cole was elected architect to the London Stock Exchange, a role he retained for 35 years. In this role, he designed the Exchange's dome, new offices in Throgmorton Street and the frontage in Old Broad Street.  He retired from the Institute in 1890.

Outside of his profession, Cole had a keen interest in astronomy and was elected a Fellow of the Royal Astronomical Society in 1862. He was also passionate about sanitary science, advocating for the erection of standpipes for drinking purposes and the abolition of the single cistern system that was in place at the time.  

Twice married, Cole was the father of Grenville Arthur James Cole, a noted geologist, and Robert Langton Cole, who succeeded him as architect to the Stock Exchange. 

He died at his home in Sutton on 10 May 1897 and was buried in West Norwood Cemetery.

Notable works 
 The church of St Mary, Abberley 
 Sir Edmund Antrobus' house, Piccadilly 
 Offices of the Gresham Life Assurance Society, opposite Mansion House.

References

1815 births
1897 deaths
19th-century English architects
Burials at West Norwood Cemetery
Architects from London
Fellows of the Royal Astronomical Society
Fellows of the Royal Institute of British Architects